Bridges in Boston include:

Anderson Memorial Bridge
Frances Appleton Bridge
Arsenal Street Bridge
Arthur Fiedler Footbridge
Boston Public Garden Foot Bridge
Boston University Bridge
Bowker Overpass
Charles River Bridge v. Warren Bridge
Charles River Dam Bridge
Charlestown Bridge
Charlestown High Bridge
Chelsea Street Bridge
Eliot Bridge
Grand Junction Railroad Bridge
Great Bridge (Cambridge)
Harvard Bridge
Leverett Circle Connector Bridge
Long Island Bridge
Longfellow Bridge
Andrew P. McArdle Memorial Bridge
North Beacon Street Bridge
Northern Avenue Bridge
Paul's Bridge
River Street Bridge (Charles River)
Tobin Bridge
Warren Bridge
John W. Weeks Bridge
Western Avenue Bridge
Leonard P. Zakim Bunker Hill Memorial Bridge

See also
 List of crossings of the Charles River

Bridges in Boston
Boston